Hugh Campbell Templeton   (born 24 March 1929) is a former New Zealand diplomat, politician and member of parliament for the National Party.

Early life and family
Templeton was born in Wyndham, Southland, in 1929. He was educated at Gore High School, King's High School, the University of Otago, and then as a Rhodes Scholar at Balliol College, Oxford University in 1952–53. He married Russian-born New Zealand novelist Natasha Templeton in Wellington in 1961.

His brother, Malcolm, was a Foreign Service officer who represented New Zealand at the United Nations. His twin brother Ian is a veteran press gallery journalist and author.

From 1954 to 1969 Templeton served with the New Zealand Department of External Affairs, first in London, and then in Wellington, before going as the last Deputy High Commissioner of Western Samoa to prepare specially for independence and then to New York to assist secure Samoa's post independence aid programmes, under Guy Powles. From 1965 to 1969 Templeton served in Wellington working on Asian and European and Defence affairs, before being elected to Parliament.

Member of Parliament

He was one of four National Party incumbents from Otago and Southland who lost their normally blue electorate to the Labour challenger over the proposed raising of the lake levels of lakes Manapouri and Te Anau, which was opposed by the Save Manapouri campaign. Labour's election manifesto was for the lakes to remain at their natural levels.

From 1972 to 1975, after losing his parliamentary seat, he was executive assistant to the Leaders of the Opposition (first Jack Marshall and then Robert Muldoon). Despite no longer being a Member of Parliament Templeton continued as the secretary of the National caucus. The electorate was renamed Ohariu and was represented by Templeton until the  when he was defeated by Peter Dunne, then a member of the Labour Party, in a three-way contest with the New Zealand Party's leader Bob Jones. His friend and diplomatic colleague Chris Beeby commented on Templeton's election losses "It must take a very special kind of talent to fuck up two blue-ribbon seats." In contrast, former attorney-general Chris Finlayson said that Templeton was "...a fine MP and Minister, whose contribution to this country has never been properly recognised."

Cabinet minister
Templeton was appointed to various positions in communications and economic portfolios during the Muldoon National Government of 1975–1984. Templeton was Minister of Revenue (1977–1982) and Minister of Trade and Industry (1981–1984) with responsibility for ANZCER (Australia – New Zealand Closer Economic Relations free trade agreement). Templeton also worked with the Prime Minister on stimulating New Zealand's onshore petroleum programme as part of Think Big. He wrote a book All Honourable Men: Inside the Muldoon Cabinet 1975–1984 on this period.

In the 1992 New Year Honours, Templeton was appointed a Companion of the Queen's Service Order for public services.

Post parliamentary career

New Zealand Flag
In 2004, Templeton supported the NZ Flag.com Trust campaign for a referendum to change New Zealand's flag. A petition for a referendum on the issue failed to gain enough signatures.

Australian honour
In November 2009, he was appointed an Honorary Officer of the Order of Australia, "for service to Australia-New Zealand economic relations, particularly through the establishment of the Australia-New Zealand Closer Economic Relations Trade Agreement".

Notes

References

Works by Templeton
 All Honourable Men: Inside the Muldoon Cabinet 1975–1984 (1995, Auckland University Press, Auckland)

External links
 The Templetons

|-

|-

|-

|-

Living people
1929 births
New Zealand National Party MPs
People from Wyndham, New Zealand
University of Otago alumni
Members of the Cabinet of New Zealand
New Zealand diplomats
New Zealand Rhodes Scholars
Alumni of Balliol College, Oxford
Companions of the Queen's Service Order
Honorary Officers of the Order of Australia
Members of the New Zealand House of Representatives
New Zealand MPs for South Island electorates
New Zealand MPs for Wellington electorates
People educated at Gore High School
Unsuccessful candidates in the 1984 New Zealand general election
Unsuccessful candidates in the 1972 New Zealand general election